In mathematics, the intermediate Jacobian of a compact Kähler manifold or Hodge structure is a complex torus that is a common generalization of the Jacobian variety of a curve and the  Picard variety and the Albanese variety. It is obtained by putting a complex structure on the torus  for n odd. The ones constructed by Weil have natural polarizations if M is projective, and so are abelian varieties, while the ones constructed by Griffiths behave well under holomorphic deformations.

A complex structure on a real vector space is given by an automorphism I with square .

Both these complex structures map  into itself and so defined complex structures on it.

For  the intermediate Jacobian is the Picard variety, and for  it is the Albanese variety. In these two extreme cases the constructions of Weil and Griffiths are equivalent.

 used intermediate Jacobians to show that non-singular cubic threefolds are not rational, even though they are unirational.

See also 

 Deligne cohomology

References

Hodge theory